Logan George is an American film director, writer, and editor. George works exclusively with his partner, Celine Held, as a co-writer and co-director. His debut feature film Topside premiered at the 77th Venice International Film Festival. His short film work has been nominated for the Short Film Palme d'Or at the 2018 Cannes Film Festival, and has premiered at Sundance Film Festival and Telluride Film Festival.

Early life and education
George was raised in Jerusalem. He attended New York University and received a Bachelor of Fine Arts in acting.

Career 
George and Held were among the "25 New Faces of Independent Film" in Filmmaker Magazine's 2017 annual list after the success of their short film Mouse, which premiered at SXSW that same year. His subsequent short films Lockdown and Caroline premiered at Sundance Film Festival and Cannes Film Festival, respectively. Caroline was nominated for the Short Film Palme d'Or, and was short-listed for the 91st Academy Awards.

George's debut feature film Topside premiered at the 77th Venice International Film Festival. George co-wrote, co-directed, and edited the film. Topside won awards at Venice and SXSW film festivals, and has been praised by critics. Sheri Linden of The Hollywood Reporter said the film is "a striking debut, cinematic and affecting," and called George and Held's direction "sensitive ... and crucial". Eric Kohn of Indiewire called the debut film "riveting," saying, "Logan George and Celine Held's debut is a taut mother-daughter survivor story with a breakthrough performance [at] its center."

References

External links 
 

1990 births
Living people
American film directors
20th-century births
American screenwriters
American film editors
New York University alumni
New York University Institute of Fine Arts alumni